is a railway station in Suma-ku, Kobe, Hyōgo Prefecture, Japan.

Lines
Sanyo Electric Railway
Main Line

Adjacent stations

|-
!colspan=5|Sanyo Electric Railway

Railway stations in Hyōgo Prefecture